Plusiodonta malagasy is a moth of the  family Erebidae. It is found in Madagascar.

References

Calpinae
Moths described in 1968
Lepidoptera of Madagascar
Moths of Madagascar
Moths of Africa